This is a list of bridges and other crossings of the Missouri River from the Mississippi River upstream to its source(s).

Crossings

See also

 List of crossings of the Upper Mississippi River
 List of crossings of the Lower Mississippi River

References

External links

Missouri River